Charles Frances Moothart (born 1989) is an American multi-instrumentalist, singer and songwriter. He is best known for his collaborations with the garage rock musicians Ty Segall and Mikal Cronin. Moothart is the drummer for Segall's current backing band, The Freedom Band. He was previously the guitarist for Segall's backing band, the Ty Segall Band, and is the guitarist and vocalist in the pair's hard rock project, Fuzz. Additionally, he is a member of Segall's collaborative project with Ex-Cult's Chris Shaw, GØGGS.

As well as playing in the Ty Segall Band, both Moothart and Cronin were members of the Moonhearts, with Moothart assisting Cronin on his solo albums, Mikal Cronin (2011) and MCII (2013).

In 2016, Moothart released his first solo album, Still Life of Citrus and Lime, under the name CFM. A second solo album, Dichotomy Desaturated, was released in March 2017. A third album, Soundtrack to an Empty Room was released July 5, 2019.

Discography
as CFM
Still Life of Citrus and Slime (2016)
Dichotomy Desaturated (2017)
Soundtrack to an Empty Room (2019)

with Ty Segall
Melted (2010)
Slaughterhouse (2012)
Twins (2012)
Manipulator (2014)
Mr. Face (2015)
Live in San Francisco (2015)
Emotional Mugger (2016)
Ty Segall (2017)Freedom's Goblin (2018)Deforming Lobes (2019)Harmonizer (2021)

with FuzzFuzz (2013)II (2015)

with Mikal CroninMikal Cronin (2011)MCII (2013)

with The MoonheartsThunderbeast (2008)Drop In Drop Out (2009)Moonhearts'' (2010)

References

American indie rock musicians
American rock guitarists
American male guitarists
American rock singers
American rock songwriters
Living people
Musicians from the San Francisco Bay Area
Singer-songwriters from California
Guitarists from California
1989 births
21st-century American singers
21st-century American guitarists
21st-century American male singers
In the Red artists
American male singer-songwriters